Damnatus: The Enemy Within was a non-commercial low-budget movie made in Germany "by fans for fans" that takes place in the Warhammer 40,000 universe.

The most enduring problem with Damnatus''' release was a conflict of copyright laws in England and Germany. German copyright law considers a copyright to be unalienable (except through inheritance - though a perpetual exclusive grant of rights is possible), and thus Games Workshop, the rights holder, claimed to lose the rights to the intellectual property of Warhammer 40,000, on which Damnatus is based. Games Workshop has thus far refused to allow it to be shown, and has not changed this position despite online petitions and requests from the filmmakers. As a result, Damnatus'' was ended indefinitely on October 15, 2007. However, it was leaked through various torrent sites and is available on YouTube.

References 

Medienrauschen (German)
Fünf Film Freunde (German)
Amateurfilm Magazin (German)

External links 

Fan films
Films based on games
Warhammer 40,000
German independent films